Kait Rhoads (born 1968) is an American glass artist. She uses traditional Italian techniques as a base to create public art, sculpture, vessels and jewelry. The aquatic realm is the root of much of her work, the result of spending six years on a boat in the Caribbean in her youth. Since moving to the Northwest over two decades ago, her fascination extended from coral colonies to kelp forests. Aquatic life infuses her sculptures with animated forms, sparkling surfaces and faceted exoskeletons. Rhoads volunteers at the Seattle Aquarium, gaining inspiration and information on ocean ecology first hand on a weekly basis.

Education
Rhoads earned an Atrium Baccalalureate from Rollins College 1989, BFA in Glass from Rhode Island School of Design 1993 and a MFA in Sculpture from Alfred University 2001. She received a Fulbright Scholarship for study of sculpture in Venice, Italy in 2001–2002.

Career
In 2014, her work was featured in the Morean Arts Center Chihuly Collection, a permanent installation of artwork by Dale Chihuly and other notable artists. Rhoads' work was noted for displaying the "creative possibility" of studio glass.
Her work is included in the permanent collection of the Carnegie Museum of Art, the Museum of Glass, the Palm Springs Art Museum, Point Defiance Zoo and Aquarium, Seattle Art Museum, the Shanghai Museum of Glass and the Tacoma Art Museum.

She is the recipient of the Doug and Dale Anderson Scholarship and the Anne Gould Hauberg Award.

References

External links
 Official web site
  Kait Rhoads Design

American glass artists
Women glass artists
Living people
1968 births